Hibiscadelphus crucibracteatus (lava hau kuahiwi) was a species of flowering plant in the family Malvaceae. It was found only in Hawaii.

It was discovered in 1981 and the single known specimen has since died.

References

crucibracteatus
Extinct flora of Hawaii
Endemic flora of Hawaii
Plant extinctions since 1500
Taxonomy articles created by Polbot